Sara Dögg Ásgeirsdóttir (born December 1976) is an Icelandic actress.

Early life and education 
Sara was born and grew up on the family farm in Skeiða- og Gnúpverjahreppur. She attended Fjölbrautaskólinn í Breiðholti from the age of 16, in the media track, and after a half year in France studying French, enrolled at the University of Iceland to study psychology. After her first film role, she returned to France, living in Paris, and then studied acting in Iceland at the Iceland University of the Arts, graduating in 2005.

Career 
Her first acting role was as the female lead, Þurildur, in Hrafn Gunnlaugsson's  (2000), for which she auditioned successfully in 1997 when she was 19 and in her first year of university, with no training in acting; she later told an interviewer she had been too shy to join her school's drama club. Her performance won a Best Actress award at the Bucheon International Fantastic Film Festival.

While studying acting, she had supporting roles in two further films, Kaldaljós and the short Hver er Barði? (Who is Bardi?) (both 2004). On graduation, she was offered a place in a theatre company in Akureyri, but took time off to have her first child. She resumed work with an independent theatre company, and in following years worked in a variety of acting jobs, including for the Reykjavík City Theatre, while also working as a flight attendant for Flugfélag Íslands.

In 2007 Sara had a supporting role in the TV series Næturvaktin; her breakthrough role was as the journalist Lára in the TV series Pressa, beginning in December the same year. Pressa was very successful, and in 2013 she won the Edda Award for Best Leading Actress for the third season.

Caring for her children during her daughter's illness caused a three-year hiatus in her career. Her work since then has included, in film, leading parts in Óskar Þór Axelsson's Ég man þig (2017), based on a novel by Yrsa Sigurðardóttir, the 2019 Swedish-Icelandic co-production Pity the Lovers, and 's Þorpið í bakgarðinum (Backyard Village, 2021), and a supporting role in Hvítur, hvítur dagur (2019). On TV, she appeared in the 2016 comedy series  (The Mayor) and had a supporting role in the 2017 series Stella Blómkvist, which became a major role in the 2021 season.

Personal life 
Sara has a daughter and a son. She did not attend the Edda Awards ceremony when she won because her son was a newborn.

Filmography 

 1999: Myrkrahöfðinginn: Þurildur
 2004: Kaldaljós: Anna
 2004: Hver er Barði? (Who is Bardi?): supporting cast
 2006: Börn: supporting cast
 2007: Næturvaktin (The Night Shift) (TV mini series): Erna (3 episodes)
 2010: Réttur (TV series): Helena (1 episode)
 2007–2012: Pressa (TV series, 3 seasons): Lára 
 2016:  (The Mayor) (TV series): Védís (4 episodes)
 2017: Ég man þig: Dagný
 2017–2021: Stella Blómkvist (TV series, 2 seasons): Dagbjört
 2018: Pity the Lovers: Anna
 2019: Hvítur, hvítur dagur: Ingimundur's wife
 2021: Þorpið í bakgarðinum (Backyard Village): Ásta the Greenhouse Farmer
 2021: Vitjanir: Kristin
 2022: Summerlight... and Then Comes the Night: Ásdís

Awards 
 2000: Best Actress Bucheon International Fantastic Film Festival
 2013: Edda Award for Best Leading Actress, Pressa

References

External links 
 Sara Dögg Ásgeirsdóttir at Móðurskipið
 

Living people
1976 births
Sara Dogg Asgeirsdottir